The New Zealand women's cricket team played against Australia women's cricket team in September 2020 and October 2020. The tour consisted of three Women's One Day Internationals (WODIs) and three Women's Twenty20 Internationals (WT20Is). On 21 August 2020, Cricket Australia named a 18-member combined squad for the fixtures. New Zealand Cricket confirmed their squad one week later, with their former captain Amy Satterthwaite returning to the side.

Originally, the WT20I matches were scheduled to be played in Sydney, with the WODI matches taking place in Queensland. However, due to the COVID-19 pandemic, a revised schedule was issued, with all the matches taking place at Allan Border Field in Brisbane, using biosecure protocols. The New Zealand team departed for the tour on 9 September 2020.

Australia won the first two WT20I matches to take an unassailable series lead. It was also Australia's tenth consecutive bilateral series win against all teams in the format. New Zealand won the final WT20I match by five wickets, with Australia taking the series 2–1. It was New Zealand's first win in thirteen matches across all formats against Australia. Australia also won the first two WODI matches to win the series, with their captain Meg Lanning scoring her 14th century in the format in the second match. Australia won the third WODI to win the series 3–0, equalling the winning streak in ODIs of 21 matches, set by Ricky Ponting's team of 2002–03.

Squads

Australia's Ellyse Perry was initially ruled out of the first game of the three-match T20I series, due to hamstring injury she suffered during the 2020 ICC Women's T20 World Cup. On 29 September 2020, Cricket Australia confirmed that Perry had been ruled out of the series due to her ongoing injury. New Zealand's Suzie Bates was ruled out of the final two WODI matches, due to shoulder injury.

Practice match
Prior to the international matches, the teams played a one-off 40 over warm-up, with Australia Women winning by 11 runs. Following the match, the teams also played a practice Super Over, with New Zealand Women winning by five runs.

WT20I series

1st WT20I

2nd WT20I

3rd WT20I

WODI series

1st WODI

2nd WODI

3rd WODI

Notes

References

External links
 Series home at ESPN Cricinfo

New Zealand 2020-21
Australia 2020-21
International cricket competitions in 2020–21
2020–21 Australian women's cricket season
2020 in New Zealand cricket
cricket
2020 in women's cricket